The 2018 Bulgarian Supercup was the 15th Bulgarian Supercup, an annual Bulgarian football match played between the winners of the previous season's First Professional Football League and Bulgarian Cup. The game was played between the champions of the 2017–18 First League, Ludogorets Razgrad, and the 2018 Bulgarian Cup winners, Slavia Sofia.

This was Ludogorets's sixth Bulgarian Supercup appearance and Slavia's first. Ludogorets lost their previous two Supercup appearances in 2015 and 2017.

Match overview

Match details

Post-match reactions

References

2018
Supercup
Sport in Stara Zagora
Bulgaria
PFC Ludogorets Razgrad matches
PFC Slavia Sofia matches